Jeyhun Jamil oglu Mirzayev (April 9, 1946, Gulabli, Aghdam – March 5, 1993, Baku) was an Azerbaijani actor and film director.

Career
Mirzayev was born in the Gulabli village, in Aghdam, Azerbaijan, to Jamil Mirzayev and his second wife Margarita. He had a half-sister from his mother's previous marriage to Yusif Mammadaliyev's brother Ibrahim. Mirzayev's father died when he was just three years old. Noted for his good performance skills, he became a child actor in 1955 when he acted in the film The Meeting. Three years later, at age 12, Mirzayev played the leading role of young Ismayil in the film Stepmother. He later graduated from Azerbaijan State University of Culture and Arts majoring in film directing. He was most notable for starring and directing an Azerbaijani war film The Scream in 1993. Mirzayev was expected to be on movie's opening but he died from a sudden heart attack.

References

External links
 

1946 births
1993 deaths
People from Agdam District
Azerbaijani male film actors
Azerbaijani male stage actors
Azerbaijani male television actors
20th-century Azerbaijani male actors
Azerbaijani people of Georgian descent